Al-Ustazah Fatimah  (or The Lawyer Fatimah) is a 1952 Egyptian comedy film directed by Fatin Abdel Wahab and produced by Mahmoud Zulfikar. It starred Kamal Al-Shennawi and Faten Hamama and was written by Ali El Zorkani.

Plot 

Fatimah (Faten Hamama) is law student that graduates from law school and starts her own law firm. In law school she meets Adel (Kamal Al-Shennawi), another student, and the two share a romantic relationship. The movie highlights the difficulties that working women suffered during that period in the Egyptian society. One of Adel's clients involves him in a crime. Adel becomes a suspect himself but by the support and defense of Fatimah, he gains his freedom. After winning the case, Fatimah and Adel marry each other.

References 
 Film summary, Faten Hamama's official site. Retrieved on January 17, 2007.

External links 

 

1952 films
1950s Arabic-language films
1952 comedy films
Films directed by Fatin Abdel Wahab
Egyptian comedy films
Egyptian black-and-white films